Alien Swirling Saucers is a spinning ride at Toy Story Land in Disney's Hollywood Studios. First announced at the 2015 D23 Expo, it opened on June 30, 2018, as part of the area's opening.

Alien Swirling Saucers uses the same ride system that powers Disney California Adventure Park's Mater's Junkyard Jamboree and Tokyo Disneyland's The Happy Ride With Baymax. The ride system shares similarities to the classic "Cuddle Up" ride from Philadelphia Toboggan Company and the classic Whip ride from William F. Mangels. It was manufactured by Zamperla. The attraction is themed as a play set that Andy won at Pizza Planet.

In 2018, it was announced that it would be constructed in Walt Disney Studios Park at Disneyland Paris as a part of its 2-billion-dollar expansion. However, more recent concept art has silently cancelled its inclusion in the expansion.

See also
 Slinky Dog Dash
 Toy Story Mania

References

External links
 Disney's Hollywood Studios site

Disney's Hollywood Studios
Walt Disney Studios Park
Toy Story Land
Pixar in amusement parks
Walt Disney Parks and Resorts attractions